Tony Burkley is a former Republican member of the Ohio House of Representatives, representing the 82nd district from 2013 to 2016. He was elected in 2012, defeating independent Pete Schlegel with 59% of the vote. He also contested a seat for the 2006 election, but lost the Republican primary to Lynn Wachtmann. Before his election to the Ohio House, Burkley served as commissioner of Paulding County, Ohio. In 2016, Burkley lost the Republican nomination for the seat to Craig Riedel.

References

Living people
Republican Party members of the Ohio House of Representatives
Date of birth missing (living people)
21st-century American politicians
Year of birth missing (living people)